Tinamba is a closed station located  east of Heyfield, on the Maffra railway line in Victoria, Australia.

History
The first post office in the town was at the railway station, and was called Tinamba Railway Station Post Office. It opened on 1 July 1887. The post office was renamed Tinamba Post Office around 1895. In 1931, there was a collision between a truck and a train at the railway crossing near the station. While there were no injuries, the truck was badly damaged. The passenger platform was shortened in length to 46 metres in 1973.

References

Disused railway stations in Victoria (Australia)
Transport in Gippsland (region)
Shire of Wellington